The World Library and Information Congress (WLIC) is an international conference held annually by the International Federation of Library Associations and Institutions (IFLA) for the library and information services sector. It brings together over 3,500 participants from more than 120 countries. It sets the international agenda for the library profession and offers opportunities for networking and professional development. The congress also offers an international trade exhibition.

Wroclaw, Poland, hosted the 2017 IFLA World Library and Information Congress in August 19–25, 2017. It was the 83rd Congress.  Previously, Poland hosted the IFLA World Congress in 1936 and 1959, both times in the nation’s capital, Warsaw. 

Auckland, New Zealand, was to host the conference in 2020, but will now do so in August 2022.

References

Library associations